Charlie Garner III (born February 13, 1972) is an American former professional football player who was a running back in the National Football League (NFL). He was drafted by the Philadelphia Eagles in the second round of the 1994 NFL Draft. He played college football at Tennessee.

Garner has also been a member of the San Francisco 49ers, Oakland Raiders, and Tampa Bay Buccaneers.

Early years
Garner grew up in Falls Church, Virginia and attended J.E.B. Stuart High School (now known as Justice High School).  His senior year, he was selected first-team All-Metropolitan (Northern Virginia, Suburban Maryland and the District of Columbia), first-team All-State, and named Virginia's player of the year after rushing for more than 2,000 yards and 38 touchdowns.

On October 16, 2009, Garner had his JEB Stuart High School number 30 jersey retired during a halftime ceremony.

College career
In 1991, Garner set junior college records for rushing yards in a game (430) and yards in two consecutive games (765) at Scottsdale (Ariz.) Community College.  Garner then transferred to the University of Tennessee and graduated with a business degree.  He is notable for starting ahead of fellow NFL RB James Stewart at Tennessee.

1992: 154 carries for 928 yards with 2 TD.  5 catches for 25 yards.
1993: 159 carries for 1161 yards with 8 TD.  12 catches for 81 yards.

Professional career
Garner was drafted by the Philadelphia Eagles in the second round of the 1994 NFL Draft.

He was a multi-talented running back and an excellent receiver. In the 2002-03 season with the Oakland Raiders, he was the team's leading rusher with 962 yards and seven touchdowns, while also leading all NFL running backs in receiving with 91 receptions for 941 yards and another four touchdowns. The 91 receptions for 941 yards were the fifth and fourth most in NFL history by a running back, respectively. He also previously held the record for most rush yards in a game by a 49er (201) later broken by Frank Gore.  The crossed forearm symbol he displayed after scoring was a tribute to his neighborhood of Bailey's Crossroads, Virginia.

In August 2005, Garner was released by the Tampa Bay Buccaneers after suffering a knee injury the previous season. During his career, he rushed 1,537 times for 7,097 yards scoring 39 touchdowns, caught 419 passes for 3,711 yards and 12 touchdowns.

During his career, Garner was nicknamed "IO," which stood for "Instant Offense," because he excelled at both rushing and receiving.

In 2017, post-football, Doctors have told Garner they believe he has Chronic Traumatic Encephalopathy, which in recent years has become a plague for former NFL players. It can only be diagnosed post-mortem.

"I don't have all my faculties anymore," Garner said. "I can't remember things. When I go to the mall or grocery store, I have to take one of my kids with me to remember where the car is parked. I have trouble remembering conversations I had five minutes ago. Bright lights bother me. I just don't feel right all the time."

NFL career statistics

References

1972 births
Living people
African-American players of American football
American football running backs
National Conference Pro Bowl players
Oakland Raiders players
Philadelphia Eagles players
San Francisco 49ers players
Tampa Bay Buccaneers players
Tennessee Volunteers football players
People from Falls Church, Virginia
Scottsdale Fighting Artichokes football players
21st-century African-American sportspeople
20th-century African-American sportspeople
Ed Block Courage Award recipients